Fay Templeton (December 25, 1865 – October 3, 1939) was an American actress, singer, songwriter, and comedian.

Her parents were actors/vaudevillians and she followed in their footsteps, making her Broadway debut in 1900.  Templeton excelled on the legitimate and vaudeville stages for more than half a century.  She was a favorite headliner and heroine of popular theater, appearing until 1934. For a time she dated Sam Shubert, of the Shubert family of theatre owners, until his death in a railroad accident.

Some of her notable performances were in H.M.S. Pinafore and Roberta. In an age of buxom beauties, she was particularly buxom, playing romantic leads despite her weight.

Early life and career
Templeton was born on December 25, 1865, in Little Rock, Arkansas, where her parents were starring with the Templeton Opera Company. Her father, John Templeton, was a well-known Southern theatre manager, comedian, and author. Her mother, Helen Alice Vane, starred with her husband. At age three, Templeton, dressed as Cupid, sang fairy tale songs between the acts of her father’s plays. Gradually, she was incorporated into the productions as a bit player, and then at age 5, had lines to recite. At age 8, she played Puck in A Midsummer Night’s Dream, making her New York debut at Grand Opera House.

At fifteen, Templeton joined a light opera company, playing in a juvenile version of Gilbert and Sullivan's H.M.S. Pinafore. She also played in The Mascot and Billee Taylor.  The same year, she eloped with Billy West, a blackface minstrel performer, but they separated after a honeymoon of six weeks.  On October 7, 1885, Templeton had her formal debut in a revival of Evangeline. The play ran for 201 performances. In this show, she displayed talent as both a comedian and mimic.  After several years on the road playing in various melodramas and musical farces, Templeton was given the title role in Hendrik Hudson, which opened at the 14th Street Theater on August 18, 1890. It was a “trouser role,” one in which an actress appears in male clothing, then a popular feature of operettas. Her role was of a faithless husband. She won accolades singing “The Same Old Thing,” but the show lasted only 16 performances.

She starred in the London premiere of Monte Cristo Jr., an 1886 hit. Between shows, in 1887, Templeton began living with Howell Osborne, a wealthy broker for Jay Gould; there is no record that they married, and the two had no children. The two lived in England and toured the continent for several years. By 1890, Templeton had formed her own opera company and starred in various operettas, none of which fared well financially. In 1895, she starred in another trouser role in E.E. Rice’s Excelsior, Jr. at Oscar Hammerstein’s Olympic Theater.

Weber and Fields and later years

In 1896, the comic duo Joe Weber and Lew Fields bought a Broadway theater and formed a stock company made up of headliners, including Templeton. Although she was now buxom even by Gay Nineties standards, her comedic versatility, long dark hair, sultry smile, and throaty-voiced singing won over audiences.

In a 1900 show, she introduced John Stromberg's “Ma Blushin' Rosie, Ma Posie Sweet,” which became the hit of the show. In 1901, she introduced “I’m a Respectable Working Girl” in the new Music Hall show; she did encore performances several times each evening. After Weber and Fields split, George M. Cohan hired Templeton to play the lead in Forty-Five Minutes from Broadway. Templeton introduced the hit songs “So Long Mary” and “Mary Is a Grand Old Name”. A few months later, she married Pittsburgh industrialist William Patterson, co-founder of Heyl & Patterson Inc., and announced her retirement from the stage; she and Patterson also had no children.

In 1911, Weber and Fields began planning their reunion with a Jubilee touring company featuring all the old Music Hall stars. Templeton was one of the first to volunteer. The tour lasted five months and broke all records for touring companies. She continued in vaudeville with an act that included songs from previous shows. In 1913, Templeton again announced her retirement. Templeton did not make any motion pictures, preferring the live theatre, although she made some phonograph recordings(as songwriter only) and performed on radio shows.

In 1925, she appeared in an old-timer’s show at the Palace Theater, working with Weber and Fields. Asked if she would continue to perform, she replied, “It’s been great fun, but it’s a new Broadway and a new theater, and hereafter I’ll be content to look on from out front”. But she returned to the stage again in 1926 to play Buttercup in a revival of Pinafore. Again, she claimed it was her last appearance on stage. When Templeton’s husband died suddenly in 1932, she returned to the stage to earn a living, appearing in Jerome Kern’s Roberta as Aunt Minnie, a dress shop owner in Paris. Bob Hope, in his American stage debut, handled the comedy. She had only one song, “Yesterdays”. The show ran for nine months.

Death
At age 71 and suffering from arthritis, Templeton found herself out of funds and entered the Actors’ Fund Home in New Jersey.
On October 3, 1939, at age 73, she died in San Francisco, California, where she had moved to live with a cousin. She was interred in Kensico Cemetery in Valhalla, New York.

Found music in Canadian shipwreck
Recordings of music composed by Fay Templeton were preserved on two 1896-1897 gramophone recordings discovered in June 2010 aboard the wreck of the Klondike Gold Rush paddlewheeler A. J. Goddard. Other recordings were discovered as well. The Goddard sank in a storm on October 22, 1901, in Lake Laberge, Yukon, and was first found in 2009; the recordings were discovered a year later after exploration of the vessel.

Templeton's recovered titles are "Ma Onliest One", recorded in New York on April 17, 1896, with Len Spencer heard in the vocals, and "Rendez Vous Waltz", recorded on July 1, 1897, with music performed by the Metropolitan Orchestra. The gramophone recording process used on these discs was developed by Emile Berliner. The recordings do not contain any evidence of Templeton's singing or speaking.

In popular culture
In the 1941 musical Babes on Broadway, Judy Garland performs an impression of Templeton singing "Mary's a Grand Old Name".

In the 1942 movie musical Yankee Doodle Dandy, Templeton was portrayed by actress Irene Manning.

In the 1968 Broadway musical George M!, she was portrayed by Jacqueline Alloway.

Selected musicals
Evangeline (1885)
Fiddle-Dee-Dee (1900) with David Warfield and De Wolfe Hopper
The Runaways (1903)
George M. Cohan's Forty-five Minutes from Broadway (1906) with Victor Moore
Hokey-Pokey (1912) with Joe Weber, Lew Fields, and Lillian Russell

Selected filmography
 The Strenuous Life; or Anti-Race Suicide (1903, short)
 How a French Nobleman Got a Wife Through the New York Herald Personal Columns (1904, short)
 Getting Evidence (1907, short)

References

External links

Fay Templeton at Who's Who in Musicals
Fay Templeton as a child playing Cupid
Fay Templeton photo gallery NYP Library
Fay Templeton North American Theatre Online

1865 births
1939 deaths
American musical theatre actresses
19th-century American actresses
American stage actresses
20th-century American actresses
Actresses from Little Rock, Arkansas
Vaudeville performers
Burials at Kensico Cemetery